Simon Mark Monjack (9 March 1970 – 23 May 2010) was an English screenwriter, film director, producer and make-up artist. He was the husband of American actress Brittany Murphy.

Early life 
Monjack was born in Hillingdon, Middlesex, to a Jewish family. He grew up in Bourne End, Buckinghamshire. He attended Juniper Hill School, Flackwell Heath, then Royal Grammar School, High Wycombe. When he was 16, his father, William (1949–1986), died of a brain tumour in Oxfordshire. His mother Linda (née Hall) is a hypnotherapist.

Career 
Monjack directed, produced, and wrote the B movie Two Days, Nine Lives in 2000. He received story credit for the 2006 biographical film Factory Girl about Warhol actress/model Edie Sedgwick. Director George Hickenlooper contended that "Monjack had nothing to do with Factory Girl" and that "he filed a frivolous lawsuit against us [...] making bogus claims that we had stolen his script. He held us literally hostage and we were forced to settle with him as he held our production over a barrel." Monjack denied these claims. In 2007, E! News reported that Monjack was slated to direct a film adaptation of D. M. Thomas's novel about Sigmund Freud, The White Hotel, with Brittany Murphy cast in a leading role.

Personal life

Marriages 
Monjack married Simone Bienne in Las Vegas in November 2001; they were divorced in 2006. That year, he met actress Brittany Murphy. In April 2007, they married in a private Jewish ceremony at their Los Angeles home. The couple did not announce their engagement beforehand and rarely made public appearances together before their marriage. On 20 December 2009, Murphy died after collapsing in their bathroom. The cause was later revealed to be pneumonia, with secondary factors of iron-deficiency anaemia and drug intoxication from prescription and over-the-counter drugs.

Legal issues 
In 2005, warrants were issued for Monjack's arrest in Virginia on charges of credit card fraud, but the charges were later dropped.

In 2006, Coutts & Co bank successfully sued Monjack, who had been evicted from four homes, for $470,000.

In February 2007, Monjack was arrested and spent nine days in jail, facing deportation, because his visa to the United States had expired.

Death 
In January 2010, Monjack's mother, Linda Monjack, told People that her son was "unwell, and the doctors are carrying out tests. On whether he has a heart problem, it is not really for me to say, you must ask him, but yes, there have been health problems in the past. I believe it's common knowledge, and it's been in the press that he had a slight heart attack a week before Brittany's death."

Monjack was found dead on 23 May 2010 in his house in Hollywood, according to the Los Angeles County coroner's office. Law enforcement sources say the Los Angeles Fire Department was called there for a medical emergency after Murphy's mother, Sharon, found Monjack unconscious in the master bedroom around 9:20 pm, and then called 911. Paramedics arrived; Monjack was pronounced dead at 9:45 pm.

The coroner's report found the cause of Monjack's death to be acute pneumonia and severe anaemia, similar to the causes attributed to his wife's death five months earlier in the same house. He was buried next to Murphy at Forest Lawn cemetery in the Hollywood Hills.

References

External links 

1970 births
2010 deaths
English expatriates in the United States
English film directors
English film producers
English-language film directors
English people of Jewish descent
English male screenwriters
British criminals
English Jewish writers
People educated at the Royal Grammar School, High Wycombe
People from Buckinghamshire
Deaths from pneumonia in California
Burials at Forest Lawn Memorial Park (Hollywood Hills)
Deaths from anemia
20th-century English businesspeople